David Daniels (October 11, 1933 – May  12, 2008) was a visual poet.

Early life 
Daniels was born in Beth Israel Hospital, Newark, New Jersey and grew up in Maplewood, New Jersey.

Career 
He made words out of pictures and pictures out of words for over 60 years. Visual Poetry: The Shape Poem: Shapes tell the words what to say and words tell the shapes what to form. 

His collection of more than 350 visual poems in PDF format, The Gates of Paradise (2000), as well as his autobiographical collection of more than 250 visual poems, Years (2003), are available online in their entirely at UbuWeb, edited by Kenneth Goldsmith; and at his own website The Gates of Paradise. His collection of visual biographical poems, Humans, a 200+ Human Beingèd Hymn To Humanity, is a work in progress.

Daniels' poems, paintings, manuscripts, and memorabilia are archived at The Poetry/Rare Books Collection of The University Libraries, State University of New York at Buffalo; the Sackner Archive of Concrete and Visual Poetry; the Ohio State University Libraries; the British Library; and the Mata and Arthur Jaffe Collection of Books as Aesthetic Objects. Selections from his body of work are featured online in a variety of zines, blogs, and collections.

Daniels' work has been featured in exhibitions and galleries on three continents.

Personal life and death 
Daniels lived in Berkeley, California and died at home among friends.

References

David Daniels' website
Xerolage 34 
UbuWeb  
John Perreault Review of David Daniels Poems

1933 births
2008 deaths
American male poets
20th-century American poets
People from Maplewood, New Jersey
People from Berkeley, California
People from Newark, New Jersey
20th-century American male writers
Visual poets